The governor of Macau was a Portuguese colonial official who headed the colony of Macau, before 1623 called captain-major. The post was replaced on 20 December 1999 upon the transfer of sovereignty over Macau to China by the office of the chief executive of Macau.

Powers of the governor of Macau

The governor of Macau was responsible for the internal and local control of the colony. External relations and military needs were dealt by the Portuguese government in Lisbon.

List of captains-major and governors of Macau (1557–1999)

The date refers to the date of appointment.

Captains-major

Governors

See also
History of Macau
Portuguese Macau

Portuguese Macau
Governors of Macau
1623 establishments in the Portuguese Empire
1999 disestablishments in the Portuguese Empire